is a former Japanese football player. He played for Japan national team.

Club career
Ono was born on November 22, 1944. After graduating from Waseda University, he joined Toyo Industries in 1967. The club won league champions 1967, 1968 and 1970. The club also won 1967 and 1969 Emperor's Cup. He retired in 1976. He played 145 games and scored 5 goals in the league.

National team career
On March 25, 1965, he debuted for Japan national team against Singapore. In 1971, he was selected Japan again. He played 3 games for Japan until 1971.

National team statistics

References

External links
 
 Japan National Football Team Database

1944 births
Living people
Waseda University alumni
Japanese footballers
Japan international footballers
Japan Soccer League players
Sanfrecce Hiroshima players
Association football defenders